Rhinostomus  is a genus of the true weevil family, Curculionidae and the monotypic tribe Rhinostomini.  They include "yucca weevils" and were previously placed in a
genus called Yuccaborus; in 2002, this was determined to be a taxonomic synonym of Rhinostomus, and the species, Y. frontalis, was moved to the genus Rhinostomus.

Species 
 Rhinostomus barbirostris
 Rhinostomus frontalis - formerly Yuccaborus frontalis
 Rhinostomus meldolae
 Rhinostomus niger
 Rhinostomus oblitus
 Rhinostomus quadrisignatus
 Rhinostomus scrutator
 Rhinostomus thompsoni

References 

 Gwannon
 Patricia Vaurie    Weevils of the Tribe Sipalini (Coleoptera, Curculionidae, Rhynchophorinae) Part 1. The Genera Rhinostomus and Yuccaborus
 Key to species of Rhinostomus
  Morrone, J.J., Cuevas, P.I. (2002) Cladistics of the pantropical genus Rhinostomus (Coleoptera: Curculionoidea: Dryophthoridae) with nomenclatural notes

External links
 
 

Curculionidae genera
Dryophthorinae